Ivan Popov (born 20 March 1990) is a Russian chess player. He was awarded the title Grandmaster by FIDE in 2007. 

In 2006 he won the "Vanya Somov Memorial – Young Stars of the World" tournament in Kirishi, Russia scoring 8½/11 points, half point ahead of Ian Nepomniachtchi.
Popov became Russian junior champion in 2007. In the same year, he also won the Under 18 division of the World Youth Chess Championships and finished as runner-up in the World Junior Chess Championship.

In 2012 Popov won the Moscow Chess Championship. The following year, he competed in the FIDE World Cup, where he was knocked out in the first round by Markus Ragger.

In January 2015 he won the 7th Chennai International Open. In September of the same year, he took part in the World Cup, from which he was eliminated in round one by Samuel Shankland. Two months later, Popov won the 2015 European Rapid Chess Championship in Minsk, Belarus. In January 2016, Popov won the 14th Parsvnath Delhi International Open edging out Attila Czebe and Valeriy Neverov on tiebreak score, after all three players finished on 8/10 points. Later in the same year, he played in the European Chess Club Cup for team SHSM Legacy Square Moscow, which took the bronze medal.

References

External links

Ivan Popov chess games at 365Chess.com

Ivan Popov team chess record at Olimpbase.org

1990 births
Living people
Chess grandmasters
World Youth Chess Champions
Russian chess players
Sportspeople from Rostov-on-Don